Dønnes is a former municipality in the Helgeland traditional region in Nordland county, Norway. The  municipality existed from 1888 until its dissolution in 1962. The former municipality encompassed the northern part of the island of Dønna, the western parts of the islands of Tomma and Løkta, and over 300 smaller surrounding islands, islets, and skerries.

Dønnes Church was probably built here at the request of Paul Vågaskalm who was governor of Alstahaug. It was built on the site of an older church sometime between 1200 and 1300. The characteristic onion dome was added in 1866. The church organ, built by Paul Christian Brantzeg, was installed in 1866.

History
Dønnes was established as a municipality on 1 July 1888 when the western part of the old Nesna Municipality was separated to form a new municipality.  Initially, Dønnes had a population of 1,348.  During the 1960s, there were many municipal mergers across Norway due to the work of the Schei Committee. On 1 January 1962 the municipality of Dønnes ceased to exist.  The part of Dønnes on the island of Tomma (population: 80) was merged into Nesna Municipality.  The remainder of Dønnes (population: 1,348) was merged with the part of Herøy Municipality on the island of Dønna (population: 19), Nordvik Municipality (population: 1,293), and the part of Nesna Municipality on the island of Løkta (population: 80) to become the new Dønna Municipality.

Name
The municipality (originally the parish) is named after the old Dønnes farm since the first Dønnes Church was built there. The island name means to "rumble" or "roar" (referring to the swell of the waves on the island).

Government
While it existed, this municipality was responsible for primary education (through 10th grade), outpatient health services, senior citizen services, unemployment, social services, zoning, economic development, and municipal roads. During its existence, this municipality was governed by a municipal council of elected representatives, which in turn elected a mayor.

Municipal council
The municipal council  of Dønnes was made up of representatives that were elected to four year terms. The party breakdown of the final municipal council was as follows:

See also
List of former municipalities of Norway

References

External links

Dønna
Former municipalities of Norway
1888 establishments in Norway
1962 disestablishments in Norway